Aleksino is a rural locality (a village) in Vorobyovskoye Rural Settlement, Sokolsky District, Vologda Oblast, Russia. The population was 27 as of 2002.

Geography 
Aleksino is located 68 km northeast of Sokol (the district's administrative centre) by road. Malye Ivanovskiye is the nearest rural locality.

References 

Rural localities in Sokolsky District, Vologda Oblast